The First Geneva Convention for the Amelioration of the Condition of the Wounded in Armies in the Field, held on 22 August 1864, is the first of four treaties of the Geneva Conventions. It defines "the basis on which rest the rules of international law for the protection of the victims of armed conflicts." 

After the first treaty was adopted in 1864, it was significantly revised and replaced in 1906, 1929, and finally 1949. It is inextricably linked to the International Committee of the Red Cross, which is both the instigator for the inception and enforcer of the articles in these conventions.

History

The 1864 Geneva Convention was instituted at a critical period in European political and military history. Elsewhere, the American Civil War had been raging since 1861, and would ultimately claim between 750,000 and 900,000 lives. Between the fall of Napoleon at the Battle of Waterloo in 1815 and the rise of his nephew in the Italian campaign of 1859, the powers had maintained peace in western Europe. 

Yet, with the 1853–1856 conflict in the Crimea, war had returned to Europe, and while those troubles were "in a distant and inaccessible region" northern Italy was "so accessible from all parts of western Europe that it instantly filled with curious observers;" while the bloodshed was not excessive the sight of it was unfamiliar and shocking. Despite its intent of ameliorating the ravages of war, the inception of the 1864 Geneva Convention inaugurated "a renewal of military activity on a large scale, to which the people of western Europe…had not been accustomed since the first Napoleon had been eliminated."

The movement for an international set of laws governing the treatment and care for the wounded and prisoners of war began when relief activist Henry Dunant witnessed the Battle of Solferino in 1859, fought between French-Piedmontese and Austrian armies in Northern Italy. The subsequent suffering of 40,000 wounded soldiers left on the field due to lack of facilities, personnel, and truces to give them medical aid moved Dunant into action. Upon return to Geneva, Dunant published his account Un Souvenir de Solferino. He urged the calling together of an international conference and soon co-founded with the Swiss lawyer Gustave Moynier, the International Committee of the Red Cross in 1863.

The International Committee of the Red Cross (ICRC), while recognising that it is "primarily the duty and responsibility of a nation to safeguard the health and physical well-being of its own people", knew there would always, especially in times of war, be a "need for voluntary agencies to supplement…the official agencies charged with these responsibilities in every country." To ensure that its mission was widely accepted, it required a body of rules to govern its own activities and those of the involved belligerent parties.

Only one year later, the Swiss government invited the governments of all European countries, as well as the United States, Brazil, and Mexico, to attend an official diplomatic conference. Sixteen countries sent a total of twenty-six delegates to Geneva. The meeting was presided over by General Guillaume Henri Dufour. The conference took place in the Alabama room at Geneva's Hotel de Ville (city hall) on 22 August 1864. The conference adopted the first Geneva Convention "for the Amelioration of the Condition of the Wounded in Armies in the Field". Representatives of 12 states signed the convention:

 
 
 
 
 
 
 
 
 
 
 
 

The United Kingdom of Norway and Sweden signed in December. The United Kingdom signed a year later in 1865. The Grand Duchy of Hesse, the Kingdom of Bavaria and Austria signed in 1866 following the conclusion of the Austro-Prussian War. The United States of America signed in 1882.

The original document is preserved in the Swiss Federal Archives in Bern. In the past it has been loaned to the International Red Cross and Red Crescent Museum in Geneva.

Application 
The convention "derived its obligatory force from the implied consent of the states which accepted and applied them in the conduct of their military operations." Despite its basic mandates, listed below, it was successful in effecting significant and rapid reforms.  This first effort provided only for:
 the immunity from capture and destruction of all establishments for the treatment of wounded and sick soldiers,
 the impartial reception and treatment of all combatants,
 the protection of civilians providing aid to the wounded, and
 the recognition of the Red Cross symbol as a means of identifying persons and equipment covered by the agreement.

Summary of provisions and revisions

The original ten articles of the 1864 treaty have been expanded to the current 64 articles. This lengthy treaty protects soldiers that are hors de combat (out of the battle due to sickness or injury), as well as medical and religious personnel, and civilians in the zone of battle. Among its principal provisions:
 Article 12 mandates that wounded and sick soldiers who are out of the battle should be humanely treated, and in particular should not be killed, injured, tortured, or subjected to biological experimentation. This article is the keystone of the treaty, and defines the principles from which most of the treaty is derived, including the obligation to respect medical units and establishments (Chapter III), the personnel entrusted with the care of the wounded (Chapter IV), buildings and material (Chapter V), medical transports (Chapter VI), and the protective sign (Chapter VII).
 Article 15 mandates that wounded and sick soldiers should be collected, cared for, and protected, though they may also become prisoners of war.
 Article 16 mandates that parties to the conflict should record the identity of the dead and wounded, and transmit this information to the opposing party.
 Article 9 allows the International Red Cross "or any other impartial humanitarian organization" to provide protection and relief of wounded and sick soldiers, as well as medical and religious personnel.

Due to significant ambiguities in the articles with certain terms and concepts and even more so to the rapidly developing nature of war and military technology, the original articles had to be revised and expanded, largely at the Second Geneva Conference in 1906 and Hague Conventions of 1899 and 1907 which extended the articles to maritime warfare. The 1906 version was updated and replaced by the 1929 version when minor modifications were made to it. It was again updated and replaced by the 1949 version, better known as the Final Act of Geneva Conference, 1949. 

However, as Jean S. Pictet, Director of the International Committee of the Red Cross, noted in 1951, "the law, however, always lags behind charity; it is tardy in conforming with life's realities and the needs of humankind", as such it is the duty of the Red Cross "to assist in the widening the scope of law, on the assumption that…law will retain its value", principally through the revision and expansion of these basic principles of the original Geneva Convention.

For a detailed discussion of each article of the treaty, see the original text and the commentary. There are currently 196 countries party to the 1949 Geneva Conventions, including this first treaty but also including the other three.

See also
Geneva Conventions
International Committee of the Red Cross
International humanitarian law
List of parties to the Geneva Conventions
Saint Petersburg Declaration of 1868

References

Further reading
 Chandler P. Anderson, "International Red Cross Organization", The American Journal of International Law, 1920
 Richard Baxter, "Human Rights in War", Bulletin of the American Academy of Arts and Sciences, 1977
 Bennett, Angela, "The Geneva Convention, the Hidden Origins of the Red Cross", Sutton Publishing, 2005
 George B. Davis, "The Geneva Convention", The American Journal of International Law, 1907
 Jean S. Pictet, "The New Geneva Conventions for the Protection of War Victims", The American Journal of International Law, 1951
 Francis Lieber, "INSTRUCTIONS FOR THE GOVERNMENT OF ARMIES OF THE UNITED STATES IN THE FIELD", Lincoln General Orders, 24 April 1863.

External links
 Facsimile of the original document
 150 years of the 1864 Geneva Convention – 150 years of humanitarian action

1
1864 treaties
19th century in Geneva
1864 in Switzerland
Treaties concluded in 1949
Treaties entered into force in 1950
Treaties of the Kingdom of Afghanistan
Treaties of the People's Socialist Republic of Albania
Treaties of Algeria
Treaties of Andorra
Treaties of the People's Republic of Angola
Treaties of Antigua and Barbuda
Treaties of Argentina
Treaties of Armenia
Treaties of Australia
Treaties of Austria
Treaties of Azerbaijan
Treaties of the Bahamas
Treaties of Bahrain
Treaties of Bangladesh
Treaties of Barbados
Treaties of the Byelorussian Soviet Socialist Republic
Treaties of Belgium
Treaties of Belize
Treaties of the Republic of Dahomey
Treaties of Bhutan
Treaties of Bolivia
Treaties of Bosnia and Herzegovina
Treaties of Botswana
Treaties of the Second Brazilian Republic
Treaties of Brunei
Treaties of the People's Republic of Bulgaria
Treaties of Burkina Faso
Treaties of Myanmar
Treaties of Burundi
Treaties of the Kingdom of Cambodia (1953–1970)
Treaties of Cameroon
Treaties of Canada
Treaties of Cape Verde
Treaties of the Central African Republic
Treaties of Chad
Treaties of Chile
Treaties of the People's Republic of China
Treaties of Colombia
Treaties of the Comoros
Treaties of the Democratic Republic of the Congo (1964–1971)
Treaties of the Republic of the Congo
Treaties of the Cook Islands
Treaties of Costa Rica
Treaties of Ivory Coast
Treaties of Croatia
Treaties of Cuba
Treaties of Cyprus
Treaties of the Czech Republic
Treaties of Czechoslovakia
Treaties of Denmark
Treaties of Djibouti
Treaties of Dominica
Treaties of the Dominican Republic
Treaties of East Timor
Treaties of Ecuador
Treaties of the Kingdom of Egypt
Treaties of El Salvador
Treaties of Equatorial Guinea
Treaties of Eritrea
Treaties of Estonia
Treaties of Eswatini
Treaties of the Ethiopian Empire
Treaties of Fiji
Treaties of Finland
Treaties of the French Fourth Republic
Treaties of Gabon
Treaties of the Gambia
Treaties of Georgia (country)
Treaties of West Germany
Treaties of East Germany
Treaties of Ghana
Treaties of the Kingdom of Greece
Treaties of Grenada
Treaties of Guatemala
Treaties of Guinea
Treaties of Guinea-Bissau
Treaties of Guyana
Treaties of Haiti
Treaties of the Holy See
Treaties of Honduras
Treaties of the Hungarian People's Republic
Treaties of Iceland
Treaties of the Dominion of India
Treaties of Indonesia
Treaties of Pahlavi Iran
Treaties of the Kingdom of Iraq
Treaties of Ireland
Treaties of Israel
Treaties of Italy
Treaties of Jamaica
Treaties of Japan
Treaties of Jordan
Treaties of Kazakhstan
Treaties of Kenya
Treaties of Kiribati
Treaties of North Korea
Treaties of South Korea
Treaties of Kuwait
Treaties of Kyrgyzstan
Treaties of the Kingdom of Laos
Treaties of Latvia
Treaties of Lebanon
Treaties of Lesotho
Treaties of Liberia
Treaties of the Kingdom of Libya
Treaties of Liechtenstein
Treaties of Lithuania
Treaties of Luxembourg
Treaties of North Macedonia
Treaties of Madagascar
Treaties of Malawi
Treaties of the Federation of Malaya
Treaties of the Maldives
Treaties of Mali
Treaties of Malta
Treaties of the Marshall Islands
Treaties of Mauritania
Treaties of Mauritius
Treaties of Mexico
Treaties of the Federated States of Micronesia
Treaties of Moldova
Treaties of Monaco
Treaties of the Mongolian People's Republic
Treaties of Montenegro
Treaties of Morocco
Treaties of the People's Republic of Mozambique
Treaties of Namibia
Treaties of Nauru
Treaties of Nepal
Treaties of the Netherlands
Treaties of New Zealand
Treaties of Nicaragua
Treaties of Niger
Treaties of Nigeria
Treaties of Norway
Treaties of Oman
Treaties of the Dominion of Pakistan
Treaties of Palau
Treaties of the State of Palestine
Treaties of Panama
Treaties of Papua New Guinea
Treaties of Paraguay
Treaties of Peru
Treaties of the Philippines
Treaties of the Polish People's Republic
Treaties of the Estado Novo (Portugal)
Treaties of Qatar
Treaties of the Socialist Republic of Romania
Treaties of Rwanda
Treaties of Saint Kitts and Nevis
Treaties of Saint Lucia
Treaties of Saint Vincent and the Grenadines
Treaties of Samoa
Treaties of San Marino
Treaties of São Tomé and Príncipe
Treaties of Saudi Arabia
Treaties of Senegal
Treaties of Serbia and Montenegro
Treaties of Seychelles
Treaties of Sierra Leone
Treaties of Singapore
Treaties of Slovakia
Treaties of Slovenia
Treaties of the Solomon Islands
Treaties of the Somali Republic
Treaties of the Union of South Africa
Treaties of South Sudan
Treaties of the Soviet Union
Treaties of Spain
Treaties of the Dominion of Ceylon
Treaties of the Republic of the Sudan (1956–1969)
Treaties of Suriname
Treaties of Sweden
Treaties of Switzerland
Treaties of the Syrian Republic (1930–1963)
Treaties of Tajikistan
Treaties of Tanganyika
Treaties of Thailand
Treaties of Togo
Treaties of Tonga
Treaties of Trinidad and Tobago
Treaties of Tunisia
Treaties of Turkey
Treaties of Turkmenistan
Treaties of Tuvalu
Treaties of Uganda
Treaties of the Ukrainian Soviet Socialist Republic
Treaties of the United Arab Emirates
Treaties of the United Kingdom
Treaties of the United States
Treaties of Uruguay
Treaties of Uzbekistan
Treaties of Vanuatu
Treaties of Venezuela
Treaties of North Vietnam
Treaties of South Yemen
Treaties of the Yemen Arab Republic
Treaties of Yugoslavia
Treaties of Zambia
Treaties of Zimbabwe
Treaties of South Vietnam
Treaties of the Sultanate of Zanzibar
Treaties extended to Greenland
Treaties extended to the Faroe Islands
Treaties extended to Niue
Treaties extended to Aruba
Treaties extended to the Netherlands Antilles
Treaties extended to the Territory of Papua and New Guinea
Treaties extended to the Belgian Congo
Treaties extended to Ruanda-Urundi
Treaties extended to French Somaliland
Treaties extended to Surinam (Dutch colony)
Treaties extended to Portuguese Macau
Treaties extended to the West Indies Federation
Treaties extended to the Colony of the Bahamas
Treaties extended to Bahrain (protectorate)
Treaties extended to Bermuda
Treaties extended to the British Antarctic Territory
Treaties extended to the Falkland Islands
Treaties extended to the Colony of Fiji
Treaties extended to the Gambia Colony and Protectorate
Treaties extended to Gibraltar
Treaties extended to British Guiana
Treaties extended to British Hong Kong
Treaties extended to the Gilbert and Ellice Islands
Treaties extended to the Sheikhdom of Kuwait
Treaties extended to Basutoland
Treaties extended to the Crown Colony of Malta
Treaties extended to British Mauritius
Treaties extended to the Colony and Protectorate of Nigeria
Treaties extended to Qatar (protectorate)
Treaties extended to Saint Helena, Ascension and Tristan da Cunha
Treaties extended to the Colony of Sierra Leone
Treaties extended to the British Solomon Islands
Treaties extended to South Georgia and the South Sandwich Islands
Treaties extended to Tanganyika (territory)
Treaties extended to the Kingdom of Tonga (1900–1970)
Treaties extended to the Trucial States
Treaties extended to West Berlin